The 2016 Invercargill mayoral election finished on Saturday, 8 October 2016 and was conducted under the first-past-the-post voting system using the postal voting system. It was held as part of the 2016 New Zealand local elections.

The incumbent mayor Tim Shadbolt sought a record eighth term, and was re-elected to the position with a reduced majority. Shadbolt was challenged by television host Tom Conroy and sitting Invercargill City councillor Karen Arnold. Shadbolt was re-elected with a decreased majority.

Candidates

Declared candidates
Karen Arnold, Invercargill City Councillor
Tom Conroy, television host
Tim Shadbolt, incumbent Mayor of Invercargill

Declined to be candidates
Neil Boniface, Invercargill City Councillor
Lindsay Dow, former Invercargill City Councillor and 2013 mayoral candidate (endorsed Conroy)
Darren Ludlow, Deputy Mayor of Invercargill
Ian Pottinger, Invercargill City Councillor (endorsed Arnold and Conroy)
Penny Simmonds, chief executive of the Southern Institute of Technology

Results
The following table gives the election results:

References

2016 elections in New Zealand
Mayoral elections in Invercargill
October 2016 events in New Zealand